The State Duma of the Federal Assembly of the Russian Federation of the 6th convocation (Russian: Государственная Дума Федерального Собрания Российской Федерации VI созыва) is a former convocation of the legislative branch of the State Duma, Lower House of the Russian Parliament. The 6th convocation meets at the State Duma building in Moscow, having begun its term on December 21, 2011 following the last session of the 5th State Duma. The term of office expired October 5, 2016, when the next parliamentary elections.

The 6th State Duma's composition was based upon the results of the 2011 parliamentary election. Of the seven parties participating in the elections, only four were able to overcome the 7% election threshold to gain representation based upon the proportional representation system.

Leadership

On December 21, 2011, the parliament elected Sergey Naryshkin from the United Russia as the Chairman of the State Duma.

At the same time, according to tradition, until the election of the Chairman of the State Duma, the meeting carried the oldest members of the State Duma – 87-year-old Vladimir Dolgikh (from United Russia) and 81-year-old Zhores Alferov (from Communist Party).

Factions

Committees
On December 21, 2011, the State Duma approved the composition of its 27 committees.

Major legislation

Some media have criticized the 6th Duma for adopting legislation which was not properly discussed, voted too quickly without consulting experts, and which may contradict the Constitution.

 May 8, 2012: Dmitry Medvedev approved as Prime Minister of Russia with 299 votes in favor.
 December 21, 2012: "Dima Yakovlev Law" with 420 votes in favor.
 March 20, 2014: Ratification of the Federal Law "On joining of Crimea to the Russian Federation" with 443 votes in favor.
 March 20, 2014: Federal constitutional law "On the adoption of the Russian Federation, the Republic of Crimea and the formation within the Russian Federation of new entities - the Republic of Crimea and the federal city of Sevastopol" with 444 votes in favor.
July 3, 2015: Moving forward the 2016 State Duma elections by three months, with 339 votes in favor.
June 24, 2016: The "Yarovaya law", with 287 votes in favor.

References

Convocations of the Russian State Duma
6th State Duma of the Russian Federation